Skinfaxe is a glacier of the King Frederick VI Coast in the Sermersooq municipality, southeastern Greenland. 

This glacier is named after Skinfaxi, the cosmic horse of Norse mythology.

Geography
Skinfaxe is a large, active glacier located on the eastern side of the Greenland ice sheet.
 
The Skinfaxe glacier flows roughly southeastward and has its terminus in the Kattertooq fjord shortly after its confluence with the Tjasse Glacier that joins it from the west.

See also 
List of glaciers in Greenland
Rimfaxe (glacier)

References

External links
Climate-related glacier fluctuations in southeast Greenland, Geological Survey of Denmark and Greenland, Department of Marine Geology and Glaciology, Copenhagen, Denmark

Glaciers of Greenland
Sermersooq